Viburnum hondurense is a species of plant in the Adoxaceae family. It is endemic to Honduras.

References

hondurense
Endemic flora of Honduras
Critically endangered flora of North America
Taxonomy articles created by Polbot
Plants described in 1944